Horio Tadauji (堀尾 忠氏; 1578 – August 8, 1604)
was a tozama daimyō in the Azuchi–Momoyama and Edo period.
His father was Horio Yoshiharu.

In 1600 at the Battle of Sekigahara, acting as a substitute for Yoshiharu who had been injured in the run up to the battle, Tadauji took part in Tokugawa Ieyasu's force.
After the battle, Ieyasu praise Tadauji for his credit and add his domain to 240,000 koku at Izumo Province.

In 1604, Tadauji died from a disease before Yoshiharu.

1578 births
1604 deaths
Daimyo
Samurai